Aizanville is a commune in the Haute-Marne department in the Grand Est region in northeastern France.

Geography
The village lies on the right bank of the Aujon, which forms part of the commune's western border.

Population

See also
Communes of the Haute-Marne department

References

Communes of Haute-Marne